William Pickering may refer to:

Politicians
William Pickering (Australian politician), Western Australian state MP
William Pickering (governor) (1798–1873), Republican governor of Washington territory, 1862–1866
William A. Pickering (1840–1907), first Protector appointed by the British government to administer the Chinese Protectorate in colonial Singapore
William Pickering (British MP) for Warwick (UK Parliament constituency)

Sports
William Pickering (cricketer) (1819–1905), organiser of the first overseas cricket tour by an English side
William Pickering (footballer) (1894–1917), Scottish-born association football player, playing for English team Burnley
Bill Pickering (footballer, born 1901) (1901–1971), English-born professional footballer, playing for English and Welsh teams
Bill Pickering (Australian footballer) (1879–1939), Australian footballer for St Kilda

Others
William Pickering (fiction), director of the National Reconnaissance Office in Dan Brown's book Deception Point
William Pickering (publisher) (1796–1854), British publisher and bookseller
Bill Pickering (rocket scientist) (1910–2004), director of the NASA/Caltech Jet Propulsion Laboratory from 1954 to 1976
William Henry Pickering (1858–1938), American astronomer